Uranothauma crawshayi is a butterfly in the family Lycaenidae. It is found in southern Tanzania, Malawi and eastern Zambia. The habitat consists of montane areas.

The larvae feed on Choristylis rhamnoides.

References

Butterflies described in 1895
Uranothauma
Butterflies of Africa